The Poland women's national volleyball team is controlled by the Polski Związek Piłki Siatkowej (PZPS), which represents the country in international competitions and friendly matches.

Results

Summer Olympics
 Champions   Runners-up   Third place   Fourth place

World Championship
 Champions   Runners-up   Third place   Fourth place

European Championship
 Champions   Runners-up   Third place   Fourth place

World Cup
 Champions   Runners-up   Third place   Fourth place

World Grand Prix
 Champions   Runners-up   Third place   Fourth place

Nations League
 Champions   Runners up   Third place   Fourth place

European League
2014 –  3rd place

European Games
2015 Baku –  2nd place
2023 Kraków – Qualified

Team

Current squad

Head coach: Jacek Nawrocki

Coach history

References

External links
Official website
FIVB profile

National women's volleyball teams
National team
National